KD Tunku Abdul Rahman is a  built for the Royal Malaysian Navy by Naval Group, formerly known as DCNS in Cherbourg, France and Navantia in Cartagena, Spain.

Development and design 

The fore section was built at Naval Group and joined to the aft section, which was built by Navantia.

On 3 September 2009, Tunku Abdul Rahman arrived in Malaysia 54 days after sailing from Toulon for her new home. According to a September 2009 report in Malaysia's English-language The Sun, the submarine was expected to be formally commissioned into the Royal Malaysian Navy in October 2009.

References 

Scorpène-class submarines of the Royal Malaysian Navy
Attack submarines
Ships built in France
Ships built in Spain
2009 ships
Submarines of Malaysia